Bridge of Hope could refer to:

 Bridge of Hope, a bridge across the Mississippi River in the U.S. state of Minnesota
 A recording by The Alfee, a popular Japanese musical group